Midnight Rose is a lost 1928 American silent crime film directed by James Young and starring Lya De Putti, Kenneth Harlan and Henry Kolker.

Cast
 Lya De Putti as Midnight Rose  
 Kenneth Harlan as Tim Regan  
 Henry Kolker as Corbin  
 Lorimer Johnston as English Edwards  
 George Larkin as Joe  
 Gunboat Smith as Casey  
 Wendell Phillips Franklin as Sonny  
 Frank Brownlee as Grogan

Preservation status
This film is currently lost.

References

Bibliography
 Bock, Hans-Michael & Bergfelder, Tim. The Concise CineGraph. Encyclopedia of German Cinema. Berghahn Books, 2009.

External links

1928 films
American crime films
1928 crime films
Lost American films
Films directed by James Young
American silent feature films
Universal Pictures films
American black-and-white films
1928 lost films
Lost crime films
1920s English-language films
1920s American films